Class B is a class of airspace in the United States which follows International Civil Aviation Organization (ICAO) airspace designation. Class B airspace areas are designed to improve aviation safety by reducing the risk of midair collisions in the airspace surrounding airports with high-density air traffic operations. Aircraft operating in these airspace areas are subject to certain operating rules and equipment requirements.

Class B airspace protects the approach and departure paths from aircraft not under air traffic control. All aircraft inside Class B airspace are subject to air traffic control. Traffic operating under VFR must be identified on radar and explicitly cleared into the airspace before they can enter. The airspace is commonly depicted as resembling an "upside-down wedding cake". The innermost ring extends from the surface area around the airport to typically 10,000' MSL. Several outer rings usually surround it with progressively higher floors to allow traffic into nearby airports without entering the primary airport's Class B airspace.

The airspace around the busiest US airports is classified as ICAO Class B, and the primary airport (one or more) for which this airspace is designated is called Class B airport. As of January 2023, there are 37 Class B airports in the United States. Despite common misconception, Nellis Air Force Base and Dallas Love Field Airport are not designated as Class B airports; however, in both cases the Class B airspace for the primary airport in the region (Harry Reid International and Dallas/Fort Worth International, respectively) has been specifically extended to cover these airports as if they were themselves Class B.

The following list of Class B airports is sorted by state and IATA Airport Code/ICAO Airport Code.

Arizona:
PHX / KPHX Phoenix Sky Harbor International

California:
LAX / KLAX Los Angeles International
NKX / KNKX Marine Corps Air Station Miramar
SAN / KSAN San Diego International/Lindbergh Field
SFO / KSFO San Francisco International

Colorado:
DEN / KDEN Denver International

Florida:
MCO / KMCO Orlando International
MIA / KMIA Miami International
TPA / KTPA Tampa International

Georgia:
ATL / KATL Hartsfield–Jackson Atlanta International

Hawaii:
HNL / PHNL Honolulu International

Illinois:
ORD / KORD Chicago–O'Hare International

Kentucky:
CVG / KCVG Cincinnati/Northern Kentucky International

Louisiana:
MSY / KMSY Louis Armstrong New Orleans International

Maryland:
ADW / KADW Andrews Air Force Base
BWI / KBWI Baltimore/Washington International

Massachusetts:
BOS / KBOS Boston–Logan International

Michigan:
DTW / KDTW Detroit Metropolitan Wayne County

Minnesota:
MSP / KMSP Minneapolis–Saint Paul International

Missouri:
MCI / KMCI Kansas City International
STL / KSTL Lambert–St. Louis International

Nevada:
LAS / KLAS Las Vegas-Harry Reid International
LSV / KLSV Nellis Air Force Base (lies within the class B surface area of LAS)

New Jersey:
EWR / KEWR Newark Liberty International

New York:
JFK / KJFK New York–John F. Kennedy International
LGA / KLGA New York–La Guardia

North Carolina:
CLT / KCLT Charlotte Douglas International

Ohio:
CLE / KCLE Cleveland Hopkins International

Pennsylvania:
PHL / KPHL Philadelphia International
PIT / KPIT Pittsburgh International

Tennessee:
MEM / KMEM Memphis International

Texas:
DAL / KDAL Dallas Love Field (lies within the class B surface area of DFW)
DFW / KDFW Dallas/Fort Worth International
HOU / KHOU Houston–Hobby (class B secondary airport)
IAH / KIAH Houston–George Bush Intercontinental

Utah:
SLC / KSLC Salt Lake City International

Virginia:
DCA / KDCA Ronald Reagan Washington National
IAD / KIAD Washington Dulles International

Washington:
SEA / KSEA Seattle–Tacoma International

See also
 List of Class C airports in the United States
 List of Class D airports in the United States
 Terminal radar service area

References

External links
 FAA Aeronautical Navigation Products (AeroNav Products), formerly National Aeronautical Charting Office (NACO)
 FAA National Flight Center Data (NFDC)
 SkyVector – geo-referenced online collection of US aeronautical charts

Class B